The Goole Steam Shipping Company was a company based in Goole, England from 1864 to 1905 which operated steamship services from Goole to northern European ports.

Career

The Goole Steam Shipping Company was established in 1864 to take over the failed business of Watson, Cunliffe and Company, who had been operating a regular steam boat service from Goole to West Continental Ports.

It was established with capital of £100,000 with the object of continuing the several Trades already existing between the Port of Goole and Antwerp, Rotterdam, Ghent and Dunkirk, and to extend them not only to those Ports, but to other places.... The directors were:
Walter Spencer Stanhope Esq, JP, Cannon Hall, Barnsley (Trustee of the Aire and Calder Navigation Company)
George Anderton Esq JP, Cleckheaton (Managing Director of the Lancashire and Yorkshire Railway)
John Wells Esq JP, Eastoft Hall, near Goole
Richard Moxon Esq JP, Pontefract (Director of the Leeds and County Bank Limited)
John Banks, jun., Esq., Howden Hall, near Goole, (Timber Merchant)
George Herring Esq., Maitland House, Kensington
Captain John Moody, Goole and London, Shipowner (also Managing Director)

The company had the distinctive funnel-colouring of dark buff with red bank and black top.

In 1895 the company took over two other shipping concerns, the Humber Steam Shipping Company which owned 3 vessels, and the Yorkshire Coal and Steamship Company which owned 11 vessels.

In 1905 the company was acquired by the Lancashire and Yorkshire Railway and all 19 of its steamers transferred to the new owner.

Ships operated by the Goole Steam Shipping Company

Ships ordered new by the Goole Steam Shipping Company

Ships acquired from the Humber Steam Shipping Company in 1895

Ships acquired from the Yorkshire Coal and Steamship Company in 1895

References

1864 establishments in England
British companies established in 1864
1905 disestablishments in England
Defunct shipping companies of the United Kingdom
Defunct companies based in Yorkshire
Goole
British companies disestablished in 1905